Scinderin (also known as adseverin) is a protein that in humans is encoded by the SCIN gene.
Scinderin is an actin severing protein belonging to the gelsolin superfamily. It was discovered in Dr. Trifaro's laboratory at the University of Ottawa, Canada. Secretory tissues are rich in scinderin. In these tissues scinderin, a calcium dependent  protein, regulates cortical actin networks. Normally secretory vesicles are excluded from release sites on the plasma membrane by the presence of a cortical actin filament network. During cell stimulation, calcium channels open allowing calcium ions to enter the secretory cell. Increase in intracellular calcium activates scinderin with the consequent actin filament severing and local dissociation of actin filament networks. This allows the movement of secretory vesicles to release sites on the plasma membrane.

References

Further reading